Lesbian, gay, bisexual, and transgender (LGBT) persons in  Aruba, which is a constituent country of the Kingdom of the Netherlands, have evolved remarkably in the past decades. Both male and female same-sex sexual activity are legal in Aruba, but same-sex marriage is not legal. Same-sex couples with Dutch nationality must travel to the Netherlands or its special municipalities to get married and the legal protection of marriage is not unconditional. Since 1 September 2021, registered partnerships have been available to both opposite-sex and same-sex couples.

Law regarding same-sex sexual activity
Same-sex sexual activity is legal in Aruba. The age of consent is 15 and is equal for both heterosexual and homosexual intercourse.

Recognition of same-sex relationships

As part of the Kingdom of the Netherlands, Aruba must recognize same-sex marriages registered in the Netherlands as well as in Bonaire, Sint Eustatius and Saba (also known as the Caribbean Netherlands) as valid. The Aruban Government initially did not recognize these marriages, but was challenged by a lesbian couple who had legally married in the Netherlands and then moved to the island. The case went to the Dutch Supreme Court, which ruled on 13 April 2007 that the Kingdom's constituent countries must recognize all of each other's marriages. Same-sex couples cannot legally marry on the island itself.

In April 2015, representatives of all four constituent countries agreed that same-sex couples should have equal rights throughout the Kingdom. The same month a registered partnership bill was submitted to the Estates of Aruba.

On 22 August 2016, Desirée de Sousa-Croes, an openly gay MP, who married her same-sex partner in the Netherlands, introduced a bill to legalize registered partnerships. However, a vote on the bill was postponed to 8 September 2016 because some MPs still needed time to make up their minds. On 8 September 2016, the Aruban Parliament voted 11–5 to legalize registered partnerships. The law took effect on 1 September 2021. Registered partnerships are open to both opposite-sex and same-sex couples.

Discrimination protections
The Aruba Criminal Code, enacted in 2012, prohibits unfair discrimination and incitement to hatred and violence on various grounds, including "heterosexual or homosexual orientation". Article 1:221 describes discrimination as "any form of discrimination, exclusion, restriction or preference, which has the purpose or effect of impacting or affecting recognition, enjoyment or the exercise of human rights and fundamental liberties in political, economic, social or cultural fields or in other areas of social life." Articles 2:61 and 2:62 provide for penalties ranging from fines to one year imprisonment.

Living conditions
Aruba is frequently referred to as one of the Caribbean's most LGBT-friendly islands, with various venues, hotels and restaurants catering to LGBT clientele or otherwise advertising as "LGBT-friendly". Several specific gay bars and clubs have opened in the capital city of Oranjestad. According to local LGBT group Alternative Lifestyle Federation Aruba, "Aruba has always been accepting, as long as it's not in their face. People are out, but discreetly out. There has never been anything official." There are numerous LGBT associations in Aruba, including Equality Aruba (Igualdad Aruba), Equal Rights Aruba and Alternative Lifestyle Federation Aruba.

Despite this, some same-sex couples living in Aruba have claimed that this openness is a more recent phenomenon. Charlene and Esther Oduber-Lamer, whose court challenge forced Aruba and the other Dutch islands in the Caribbean to recognize same-sex marriage, reported frequent harassment and having rocks thrown at them. The Aruban Government was particularly vocal in its opposition to same-sex marriage during the court challenge, which occurred between 2004 and 2007. The Roman Catholic Church, being the largest denomination on the island, has also contributed to more mainstream societal opposition to LGBT rights and same-sex marriage, especially compared to the Netherlands. Nevertheless, in 2016, the Aruban Parliament voted to legalise same-sex and different-sex registered partnerships with many of the same rights as marriage, the first time a Caribbean parliament had done so.

Summary table

See also

LGBT rights in the Netherlands
LGBT rights in the Americas
LGBT rights in Curaçao
LGBT rights in Sint Maarten
Same-sex marriage in Aruba, Curaçao and Sint Maarten
Politics of Aruba

Notes

References